The Sol Plaatje Prize for Translation is a bi-annual prize, first awarded in 2007, for translation of prose or poetry into English from any of the other South African official languages. It is administered by the English Academy of South Africa, and was named in honour of Sol Plaatje.

Award winners
2019 - Michiel Heyns for The Shallows (Vlakwater by Lettie Viljoen), from Afrikaans
2018 - Leon de Kock and Karin Schimke for Vlam in die Sneeu, from Afrikaans
2017 - Held over to 2018
2015 - Not awarded
2013 - Daniel Sekepi Matjila and Karen Haire for Lover of His People: A biography of Sol Plaatje, from Setswana (by Seetsele Modiri Molema)
2011 - Daniel Kunene for My Child! My Child! by C. L. S. Nyembezi
2009 - Award withdrawn (Jeff Opland for Abantu Besizwe: Historical And Biographical Writings (by S.E.K. Mqhayi))
2007 - Michiel Heyns for Agaat (by Marlene van Niekerk)

References

South African literary awards
Translation awards
Awards established in 2007
South African literary events